ZZP may refer to:

 Alliance for Primorska (Zveza za Primorsko), an extraparliamentary party in Slovenia
 Together for Change (Zajedno za Promjene), a Montenegrin political party
  (Self-employed individual); see 
  (Polish Professional Union), the Polish labour union formed to resist the Germanisation of Poland during the early 20th century

See also
 KZZP, a commercial FM radio station